The UNTAET Crime Scene Detachment was the common title for an elite investigative unit created in the war-torn and newly liberated country of East Timor in November 1999, under the direction of the United Nations Transitional Administration in East Timor, consisting of International Police, Australian military police and New Zealand military police. The unit was tasked with performing the exhumations of several hundred East Timorese homicide victims killed during the UN mandate for the East Timor mission. The unit became best known for its investigations and exhumations relating to both the Liquiçá Church Massacre and the Manuel Carrascalão House Massacre.

After the crime scene detachment, the International Police assigned to the unit would investigate the case. The International Police portion of the unit primarily worked out of Liquiçá and its surrounding districts, whereas the military element worked island-wide throughout East Timor. Initially commanded by Steve Minhinnet of Great Britain, the unit was later commanded by American investigator Karl Clark. Throughout its existence, it relied heavily on intelligence information collected by American intelligence officer Alan Williams. With the rotation of new International Police into East Timor, the unit was eventually disbanded toward the end of 2000, and absorbed into the Human Rights investigative unit in Dili, called the Serious Crimes Unit. Karl Clark, an original member of the unit, eventually played a pivotal role in human rights investigations in East Timor, while other unit police members moved on to other UN mission locations.

References

 
 
 https://web.archive.org/web/20060425031821/http://lists.econ.utah.edu/pipermail/marxism/2005-April/023693.html
 https://web.archive.org/web/20061020023805/http://www.commondreams.org/cgi-bin/print.cgi?file=%2Fnews2005%2F0406-04.htm
 https://web.archive.org/web/20060829154235/http://cpa.org.au/garchve05/1223massacre.html
 

Law enforcement units